Kirill Olegovich Aloyan (born 22 January 1999) is a Russian professional footballer.

References

External links 
 
 

1999 births
Living people
Russian sportspeople of Armenian descent
Russian footballers
Association football defenders
Russian expatriate footballers
Expatriate footballers in Armenia
Expatriate footballers in Belarus
FC Zenit Saint Petersburg players
FC Alashkert players
FC Yenisey Krasnoyarsk players
FC Slutsk players
FC Dynamo Bryansk players
Armenian Premier League players
Belarusian Premier League players